Palazzo Scanderbeg or Palazzetto Scanderbeg  is a  Roman palazzo, located on the Piazza Scanderbeg (Num. 117) near the Trevi Fountain. It takes its name from its fifteenth-century host, the Albanian national hero Skanderbeg. The Palazzo was host of the National Museum of Pasta Foods (Museo Nazionale delle Paste Alimentari). Recently re-opened it is the host of a residence - Palazzo Scanderbeg Townhouse and Palazzo Scanderbeg Suites.

References

Palaces in Rome
Museums in Rome
Food museums in Italy
Rome R. II Trevi
Skanderbeg